Pseudotothyris ignota is a species of armored catfish found in coastal drainages from Iguape in São Paulo state to São João do Rio Vermelho in Santa Catarina state, Brazil.

References

Otothyrinae
Catfish of South America
Fish of Brazil
Endemic fauna of Brazil
Taxa named by Fernanda de Oliveira Martins
Taxa named by Heraldo Antonio Britski
Taxa named by Francisco Langeani-Neto
Fish described in 2014